Rossano Galtarossa (born 6 July 1972 in Padua) is an Italian competition rower and Olympic champion.

He received a gold medal in quadruple sculls at the 2000 Summer Olympics in Sydney, together with Agostino Abbagnale, Simone Raineri, and Alessio Sartori.

He received a silver medal in quadruple sculls at the 2008 Summer Olympics in Beijing.

He received a bronze medal in quadruple sculls at the 1992 Summer Olympics in Barcelona and in double sculls at the 2004 Summer Olympics in Athens, with Alessio Sartori.

References

External links 
 
 
 

1972 births
Living people
Sportspeople from Padua
Italian male rowers
Olympic rowers of Italy
Olympic gold medalists for Italy
Olympic bronze medalists for Italy
Olympic silver medalists for Italy
Rowers at the 1992 Summer Olympics
Rowers at the 1996 Summer Olympics
Rowers at the 2000 Summer Olympics
Rowers at the 2004 Summer Olympics
Rowers at the 2008 Summer Olympics
Olympic medalists in rowing
Medalists at the 2008 Summer Olympics
Medalists at the 2004 Summer Olympics
World Rowing Championships medalists for Italy
Medalists at the 2000 Summer Olympics
Medalists at the 1992 Summer Olympics